Orange Walk Town is the fourth largest town in Belize, with a population of about 13,400 (Official Release of the Main Findings of the 2010 Population and Housing Census). It is the capital of the Orange Walk District. Despite the English name of the city, its residents are primarily Spanish-speaking mestizos.

History
In the days of the Maya civilization, the area was known as Holpatin. The district is home to the biggest Maya temple of the pre-classic period. The Maya of the area came in contact with the Europeans in the 1530s, after which the two groups fought over land. In 1848, there was a massive influx of Maya and Mestizos from Mexico, fleeing the Caste War of Yucatán (1847–1901). This caused a rapid growth of population. In 1872, it was the site of the Battle of Orange Walk. Lamanai (meaning "submerged crocodile" in Mayan dialect) and Cuello ("chin" in Spanish) are two very early Mayan ruins located in Orange Walk. Cuello is in fact the oldest Mayan settlement in Belize, dating back to around 2000 BC.

In the nineteenth century, Orange Walk was a small city mostly concentrated on the banks of the Rio Hondo River until the construction of the Philip P. Goldson Northern Highway after World War 2. This sparked massive growth around the highway, and it became what is now Queen Victoria Avenue in downtown Orange Walk.

Economy

With the Maya and Mestizos came their many traditions that today abound in the region. One such thing that they brought was sugar cane, which in the years to come became the basis of Belize's leading industry. Today, this industry continues to thrive in the region, and Orange Walk Town is nicknamed "Sugar City". The local Tower Hill Sugar Factory (Belize Sugar Industries) handles all of the country's sugar cane output. Also, rum is made straight from the local cane by refineries such as Cuello Refinery Ltd, Caribbean Refinery and Old Master Rum. It is then mostly consumed nationally and not customarily exported. The farming of other crops, and tourism, also play a role in the economy. Overall, Orange Walk has one of Belize's strongest and most productive economies. Many families are rich due to importing goods from nearby Mexico. The poverty rate in Orange Walk is 24.9%, the second-lowest in the country. The quality of life is also high due to the good economy. Many Orange Walk citizens eat out several times a week, more often than many other Belizeans. The median income adjusted for Purchasing Power Parity (PPP) is about US$12,000.

Tourism in Orange Walk is mostly ecotourism.

Government and governmental services

Orange Walk government
Orange Walk is in the Orange Walk municipality, which has a People's United Party (PUP) majority. The PUP is a left-center party and one of the two major parties in the country. Thus, the mayor Kevin Bernard is a member of the aforementioned party.

Departments of the city government are
 Human Resources, Manager Faride Riverol
 Traffic Department, Manager Aldair Lima
Responsibilities: 
    "The Issuing and renewal of drivers’ licenses and vehicle licenses for all individuals and vehicles registered in the Orange Walk area.
    The Inspection of all modes of transportation that require a license under the law to traffic on any street.
    The monitoring and supervision of all parades, funerals and similar activities which impede the normal flow of Traffic.
    The regulation of Parking and all activities related to parking within the town.
    The strategic placement of appropriate traffic signs and traffic lights throughout the town.
    Public education and information on basic Traffic Laws."
 Valuation Department 
 Revenue Department, Manager Digno Polanco
 Department of Operations, Manager Omar Mendez
 Department of Public Relations, Manager German Novelo

Governmental and public services

General
Healthcare - the Northern Regional Hospital is the public hospital of the Orange walk area. It has a total of 57 beds and has 11 outlying health centers and 16 outlying health posts.

Education - There are three government primary schools in Orange Walk Town. There are two government high schools.

The National Fire Service has a branch in Orange Walk.

Orange Walk is home to seven financial institutions, including Atlantic Bank, Belize Bank, and Scotia bank.

There are six insurance agents in Orange Walk.

Internet
Belize Telemedia Limited and Smart, the two phone and internet service providers most common in Belize, have offices in Orange Walk. So does Centaur, a cable television and internet provider unique to Orange Walk.

Radio stations
 Kairos Belize Radio 89.7
 Sugar City Radio Station (Orange Walk) (103.1 FM) SCRS.bz
 Home station of the UDP in Orange Walk.
 Fiesta FM (Orange Walk) (106.7 FM)
 See Centaur Cable Network. Home station of the PUP in Orange Walk.
 Power FM 95.5
 East Radio 104.9 FM
 KREM Radio 91.1
 Estereo Amor 95.9
 Love FM Orange Walk Repeater 98.1
 More FM 107.1
 Estereo Tu y Yo 98.5
 Universal Radio 88.5

Future development plans

Orange Walk Local Planning Work Group
The Orange Walk Local Planning Work Group (WLPG) is a governmental organization formed for the positive development of the community. The members of the group are:

1. Mayor Kevin Bernard, Orange Walk Town

2. Ricardo Moguel, Community Representative Chapter 1

3. Efrain Alpuche, OWTC Representative

4. Mynor Ramirez, OWTC Representative(Chapters 1–3)

5. Osmany Salas, Community Representative

6. Omar Mendez, OWTC Representative and Operations Officer

7. Neri Ramirez, OWTC Representative

8. Jaime Briceno, Community Representative

9. Adrian Leiva, Community Representative

10. Josue Carballo, OWTC Representative

11. Yolanda Gomez, Community Representative

12. Wender Alamilla, OWTC Representative (Chapters 4–5)

With the support of:

German Novelo, Public Relations Officer, OWTC.

Juan Novelo, IT Officer, OWTC

Projects planned
The Orange Walk Local Planning Work Group (WLPG) and its members are planning many infrastructural projects in the city area. These include: 
 Pavement of major streets and boulevards
 Upgrades of major intersections
 Paving all minor streets
 Aerial mapping of the city
 Creating more development zones
 Creation of a bus depot
 Upgrading of the Central Park with free Internet and other accommodations 
 Creating many new parks and green spaces

Climate

The climate in Orange Walk is generally dry and relatively warm compared with other regions. Rainstorms are usually brief when they do occur.

Ethnic and Racial Demographics
The region is highly populated by Indigenous Latino, Yucatec Mayas, Kriols, Mennonites, Chinese, Taiwanese, Indians, and other people from Central America. Approximately 78% of the population identifies as Indigenous Latino (Indigenous), 11.1% identify as Mennonite, Maya make up 1.7% of the populace, Garifuna 0.8%, East Indian 0.7%, Creole 7.2%, White 0.3%, and Asian 0.8%. As a whole, Orange Walk is the least ethnically diverse city in Belize, with a mainly Hispanic population.

Religion

Religion is important to most in Orange Walk, to some more than others.
There is a large Catholic presence, although many Evangelicals can also be found preaching in the streets and proselytizing. There are many churches and ministries in Orange Walk. About 65% of Orange Walk residents are Roman Catholic, Protestants make up 22%, Jehovah's Witnesses 2%, and Hindu, Buddhist, Islam, Mormons, and Salvation Army make up about 1% each.

There are about fifty registered churches in the Orange Walk region. The following are some of the ministries and churches located in the greater Orange Walk area:

 Iglesia de Dios Pentecostes "Lirio de los Valles"
 Harvest Bible Chapel
 Orange Walk Church of the Nazarene
 Lighthouse Mennonite Church
 Immaculate Conception Catholic Church
 Betel Evangelical Church
 Iglesia Cristiana Josue AD
 Full Gospel Church of God (IDEC)
 La Inmaculada Roman Catholic Church
 Koinonia Ministries
 Jesus Deaf Church
 Hall of Jehovah's Witnesses OW
 Awakening Ministries
 St Michael Catholic Church
 Alfa y Omega Church
 Maranatha Seventh Day Adventist Church
 Carmelita Baptist Chapel
 Mision Internacional Vida Abundante
 Temple Missionary Baptist Church
 United in Christ Evangelical Church
 Shalom Mennonite Church
 World Wide Missionary Movement Church
 Rio Hondo Mennonite Church

Language 
The most used language in Orange Walk Town is English, but Spanish is also very common and almost everyone speaks it to some extent. The official statistics as of 2010 report that 0.7% speak Chinese, 16.8% speak Kriol, 62.2% speak English, 0.5% speak Garifuna, 10% speak German (Low German or "Plattdeutsch"), 2.3% speak Maya/Indigenous tongues, 85.6% speak Spanish, and 0.6% speak other languages.

Population and housing
2010 Population and Housing Census has Orange Walk town's total population as 13,400 residents. Of this 6,642 are males and 6,758 are females. The total number of households is 3,361 and the average household size is 4.4. 88.1% of these Orange Walk residents live in a full private house, 5.9% in part of a private house, 1.3% in an apartment, and 4.5% in other. About 14% of Orange Walkeños rent a dwelling, whereas about 59.4% own houses mortgage free. Most of the buildings in the city were built from 1990 to 1999. Of these, over half are made of brick, and a quarter of wood. About three-fourths of all roofs are made of sheet metal. Homes and buildings in Orange Walk are the best kept, with the lowest rate of necessary repair in the country.

Acoording to official sources, Orange Walk is becoming more congested and densely populated, and is moving toward apartment flats as an alternative to traditional houses. However, up to 1,200 plots of land are abandoned or have dilapidated, derelict housing.

The 2019 population estimate is around 22,000. The growth is about 2.7%, far larger than the national population growth of 1.9%.

Education
The quality of education in Orange Walk is among the highest in Belize. Students from Orange Walk frequently score well on standardized examinations 
within and without the country.

The literacy rate of Orange Walk is 72.6%, which is the second-lowest rate in the country after Punta Gorda.
.

The school attendance figure is about 55% of males and 45% of females for primary school, 50%-50% for high schools, and 40% of males versus 60% of females attend college.

In Orange Walk about a quarter of all students surpass 70% on their standardized exams, compared with only 15% doing so in Stann Creek District. Orange Walk has the highest rate of trained teachers in the country, second only to Corozal.

Despite the high quality of education, Orange Walk has the second-highest rate of children aged 5–13 outside of school in the country, at 24.1%.

Orange Walk has one of the lowest student budgets in the country, less than half that of Belize City. Most Orange Walk residents pay for education out of their own pockets, spending 12% of their total budgets on it. This is almost double the 7.4% that Toledo residents spend on education.

Primary schools
Primary schools include:

 Trial Farm Government School 
 Louisiana Government School
 Chapel School
 New Life Presbyterian Primary School
 Solomon's SDA School
 La Inmaculada Primary School
 St Peter's Anglican School
 Carmelita Government School

High schools
High schools in the Orange Walk metropolitan area include:

 Orange Walk Technical High School
 New Hope High School
 Bishop Martin High School
 Muffles High School
 San Juan Bautista High School

Tertiary schools and colleges
The following are the tertiary institutions/universities located in Orange Walk:

 Orange Walk ITVET
 Muffles College
 University of Belize Orange Walk Campus
 Galen University

Parks and public spaces
Orange Walk has many parks, public spaces, and green areas. There are large, ancient, sprawling trees scattered throughout the city.

Parks
The Town Council in Orange Walk has done well in creating many parks in the area. They are mostly clean and family-friendly. They include:

 Queen Elizabeth Park and Market Area
 Union Town Park
 Louisiana Nature Park
 San Lorenzo Site Park
 Trial Farm Park
 Orange Walk Central Park
 Independence Park

Public spaces

 Multipurpose Complex 
 East Sports Center
 People's Stadium
 Trial Farm Basketball and Sports Area

Monuments and historical sites

 Marcos Canul Monument adjacent to the Town Barracks
 La Inmaculada Church and Monolith
 Unnamed Soldier World War 2 Statue in Independence Park
 Trenches constructed to protect the colonial settlement in 1876
 Fort Mundy
 Colonial Anglican Church and many other British-style colonial edifices
 Ancient standard colonial water tower downtown represents centuries of British influence
 The police station sits atop a buried Mayan  Pyramid - it was known as Dzuluinicob, or “land of foreigners." in the Pre-Columbian era.
 Statue of Yucatec Maya woman breastfeeding in Queen Victoria Park

Transportation
The locality is served by the Orange Walk Airport . Local bus service to and from Belize City to the south and Corozal Town to the north operates approximately every half-hour. Taxis and minibuses are also available for transportation within the city and to surrounding villages and towns. The town is a mid-stop point between Belize City and Chetumal, Mexico, and for this reason many large tour buses pass through on a regular basis. The Orange Walk District in general, and Orange Walk Town in particular, are drug-trafficking centers due to their close proximity to Mexico.

The streets in Orange Walk town are very well paved in most areas, with almost no potholes. There are some speed bumps throughout the town, as well as traffic lights at main intersections (which are a rarity in Belize).

Statistics

In accordance with the Orange Walk Transport Authority, there are about twenty daily buses coming into Orange Walk from the surrounding areas. About fifty buses leave Orange Walk to surrounding towns, villages, and to Quintana Roo, Mexico.

Social issues
Orange Walk is generally a safe city. 
Only about 0.5 people per 1,000 are homeless.
Orange Walk has a very low internet access rate at 22.3%, compared with 38.2% in Belize City.

Orange Walk has the second-highest marriage rate in the country at 43.7% of all persons.

A relatively low number of foreign-born persons live in the city (10.8%, as opposed to 14.5% national average).

Healthcare
The town is served by the Northern Regional Hospital, formerly called the Orange Walk Hospital, and a second major private hospital named Northern Medical Specialist Plaza. Orange Walk has a very good quality of healthcare. The infant mortality rate is 8.5 per 1,000 live births, and the crude death rate was 4.2 per 1,000 persons in 2010. Several clinics are available in Orange Walk, including, but not limited to: 
 La Asuncion Radio-Diagnostic Center & Medical Lab on Asuncion Street
 Sonoscan Ultrasound Care on Baker's Street
 Eve's Specialty Clinic on Ketz Lagoon Street
 Davila's Ultrasound on Corozal Street
 Sugar City Medical Center
 Polaris Medical Clinic on Cinderella Street
 Genesis Medical Clinic on San Antonio Road
 Brigido's Medical and Dental Clinic
 Osorio's Family Health Clinic on Queen Victoria Street
 The Dental Clinic of Dr Silvia Rios on Otro Benque Street
 Dialisis de Belice (Belize-Corozal Road)

There are also many pharmacies:

 Alex Pharmacy (Alex Lopez) (157 Belize Corozal Rd)
 De La Fuente Pharmacy (16 Main St)
 Pharmacy Lucille (Beytias St)
 De La Fuente Pharmacy - Holy Trinity Branch (Holy Trinity St)
 Prisma's Pharmacy (San Antonio Rd)
 MediGreen Pharmacy (28 Belize-Corozal Road)
 DR's Pharmacy Ltd. (Santa Ana St.)
 Selene's Pharmacy (Progress Street)
 RAD's Pharmacy (San Antonio Road)
 DKNN's Pharmacy (Main Street)
 123 Supermarket (Liberty Avenue)

References

External links

Mestizo communities in Belize
Populated places in Orange Walk District